Bosse Kramsjo (born 1951 in Sweden) is a former faculty member of the Swedish Board for Education in International Development (Sando U-centrum, from mid-1995 Sida Sando), taught development studies, poverty alleviation, rural development, people's mobilization and organization, food security and the agrarian sector, micro finance, participatory methods, the role of the development aid worker. A former director, Sida Sando, Sweden, Bosse was responsible for Master degree course on development, in cooperation with the University of Gothenburg.

Books
He has written number of books. His views on rural poor found at Breaking the Chains:Collective Action for Social Justice among the Rural Poor in Bangladesh In this book he Shows, how the landless poor of Bangladesh have worked to determine their own future, independent of the existing power structure. Demonstrates effective organizing by the landless, the results of their action, and thoughts on the way forward. In recent articles he has written his experiences on micro-credit & poverty alleviation program in Bangladesh.

References

External links
Micro-Credit : myth manufactured
Bangladesh a Quest for Reality

Living people
Swedish essayists
Swedish male writers
1951 births
Male essayists